Lluís Domènech i Montaner (21 December 1850 – 27 December 1923) was a Spanish architect who was highly influential on Modernisme català, the Catalan Art Nouveau/Jugendstil movement. He was also a Catalan politician.

Born in Barcelona, he initially studied physics and natural sciences, but soon switched to architecture. He was registered as an architect in Barcelona in 1873. He also held a 45-year tenure as a professor and director at the Escola d'Arquitectura, Barcelona's school of architecture, and wrote extensively on architecture in essays, technical books and articles in newspapers and journals.

His most famous buildings, the Hospital de Sant Pau and Palau de la Música Catalana in Barcelona, have been collectively designated as a UNESCO World Heritage Site.

As an architect, 45-year professor of architecture and prolific writer on architecture, Domènech i Montaner played an important role in defining the Modernisme arquitectonic in Catalonia. This style has become internationally renowned, mainly due to the work of Antoni Gaudí. Domènech i Montaner's article "En busca d'una arquitectura nacional" (In search of a national architecture), published 1878 in the journal La Renaixença, reflected the way architects at that time sought to build structures that reflected the Catalan character.

His buildings displayed a mixture between rationalism and fabulous ornamentation inspired by Spanish-Arabic architecture, and followed the curvilinear design typical of Art Nouveau. In the El castell dels 3 dragons restaurant in Barcelona (built for the World's Fair in 1888), which was for many years the Zoological Museum, he applied very advanced solutions (a visible iron structure and ceramics). He later developed this style further in other buildings, such as the Palau de la Música Catalana in Barcelona (1908), where he made extensive use of mosaic, ceramics and stained glass, the Hospital de Sant Pau in Barcelona, and the Institut Pere Mata in Reus.

Domènech i Montaner's work evolved towards more open structures and lighter materials, evident in the Palau de la Música Catalana. Other architects, like Gaudí, tended to move in the opposite direction.

Domènech i Montaner also played a prominent role in the Catalan autonomist movement. He was a member of the La Jove Catalunya and El Centre Català and later chaired the Lliga de Catalunya (1888) (Catalan League) and the Unió Catalanista (1892) (Catalan Union). He was one of the organisers of the commission that approved the Bases de Manresa, a list of demands for Catalan autonomy. He was a member of the Centre Nacional Català (1889) and Lliga Regionalista (1901), and was one of the four parliamentarians who won the so-called "candidature of the four presidents" in 1901. Though re-elected in 1903, he abandoned politics in 1904 to devote himself fully to archeological and architectural research.

He died in Barcelona in 1923 and was buried in the Sant Gervasi Cemetery in that city.

Education and teaching career 

Born in Carrer Avinyó in Barcelona, he was the second son of Pere Domènech i Saló, a prestigious publisher and book-binder, and Maria Montaner i Vila, a member of a prosperous family from Canet de Mar, where Domènech i Montaner spent much time in his home/office, now converted into a museum. After having studied physics and mathematics, he studied as an architect in Barcelona and at the school of architecture of the Real Academia de Bellas Artes de San Fernando in Madrid, from where he graduated on 13 December 1873.

Having completed his studies, he travelled through France, Switzerland, Italy, Germany and Austria to gain experience of trends in architecture.

In 1875, as soon as the Barcelona school of architecture opened, he joined it, along with his friend Josep Vilaseca, as a teacher of topography and mineralogy. In 1877 he became professor of "Knowledge of materials and the application of physiochemical science to architecture". In 1899 he was appointed professor of "Architectural Composition" and project teacher. In 1900 he became director of the school of architecture, and between 1901 and 1905 he was substituted by Joan Torras i Guardiola, Domènech at this time being in Madrid as a deputy in the Congress. He returned to the post from 1905 to 1920. His teaching career lasted 45 years, and he exercised a considerable influence on what was to become Modernisme in Catalonia. With his colleague Antoni Maria Gallissà he subsequently set up a workshop for advanced work on the decorative arts applied to architecture.

Architectural works 
Domènech i Montaner's buildings combine structural rationality  with extraordinary ornamentation  inspired by Hispano-Arabic architectural tradition and by the curves typical of  Modernisme. They were in the architectural vanguard at the time, with the use of structural steel and the total utilization of exposed brickwork, and incorporated a profusion of mosaics, ceramics and stained glass, arranged in exquisite harmony.

As director of the School of Architecture he promoted a style that was adopted by many of his pupils. Puig i Cadafalch regarded him as "a man of a certain period and of a certain artistic school, who was a sounding-board for developments in other countries, adapting them to his own character in an innovative way".

As the years went by, unlike many Modernista architects, Domènech i Montaner's buildings tended to become lighter, reducing the amount of structural material but retaining ornamentation as a primary element.

Pre-Modernista period
No sooner had Domènech graduated than he set out on a tour of Europe in the company of  Josep Vilaseca, and was attracted by Prussian architecture. This, as well as Vilaseca's personality, had an influence on his subsequent work.

This influence can be seen in a number of Domènech's works from before 1878 (the year when he published his manifesto En busca d'una arquitectura nacional): the Clavé family tomb and the Casa Montaner on the Ronda de la Universitat, as well as a project for the provincial education institutions that was never built. These works can be regarded as pre-Modernista.

The building for the Editorial Montaner i Simón (1879–1885) was in fact his first work after the manifesto and it employs Mudejar decorative solutions while not abandoning Germanic influence and symbolism. Domènech went beyond European manifestations, employing a forthright new language to implement an architectural approach founded on a new, integrated concept of all the arts. It was commissioned by his uncle Ramon Montaner i Vila, who also had him build his town house in Barcelona, the Palau Ramon Montaner, and remodel the Castell de Santa Florentina, his residence in  Canet de Mar.

Modernisme 
Domènech received a number commissions associated with the Exposición Universal de Barcelona (1888), thanks to his close friendship with Elies Rogent, director of the School of Architecture and of the works for the Exposition. He was a member of the Mining Committee and the architect in charge of the improvement works on the  Parc de la Ciutadella. He also refurbished the Barcelona City Hall to accommodate the  royal family during the event. The best-known of these works are undoubtedly the construction of the Hotel Internacional, which no longer exists, but which was put up in a record time of 53 days, and the cafe-restaurant known as the Castell dels Tres Dragons (now the  Museu de Zoologia de Barcelona), the building that best expresses these new trends and is considered to mark the beginning of the  Modernista period.   The use of exposed chamfered brickwork and the use of exposed structural ironwork gives the building an industrial look, solid and compact on the lower levels but agile and transparent above, with its pierced parapets crowned by a pinnacle. The interior is an open space with two arches that support a stepped, symmetrical roof. Domènech incorporated the best of the applied arts and ornamental solutions that became permanent, such as the florid crowns of the capitals. Ceramics from the Pujol i Bausis factory were used, with designs by Antoni M. Gallissà, Josep Llimona, J.A. Pellicer and Alexandre de Riquer. There were also stained glass windows by Antoni Rigalt i Blanch, but these have now perished. The use of these techniques on the Montaner i Simón building inspired Hendrik Petrus Berlage when he designed the Amsterdam bourse.

Subsequently, he designed private residences such as the Casa Navàs i Rull in Reus; the  Casa Lleó Morera, the Casa Thomas in Barcelona and the Casa Solà Morales in Olot. In all of these he adopted an integral approach to modernisme, with an intensive use of the applied arts, particularly sculpture, mosaic and stained glass.

The major works 
At the height of his  professional career, Domènech i Montaner took on his largest and most complex works, the ones for which he is most widely recognized. His work on these projects overlapped in time, and he was able to take advantage of the experience gained on each one. Much of the knowledge gained and many of the technical innovations employed on the Expo restaurant (the Castell dels Tres Dragons, now the geology museum) were later used in the design and construction of the Palau de la Música, and the avant-garde concepts applied in the  Institut Pere Mata were later adopted and improved on at the Hospital de Sant Pau.

The Palau de la Música Catalana and the Hospital de Sant Pau both won awards  in the annual architectural  competition organized by the Barcelona City Council, in 1905 and 1913 respectively. More recently UNESCO  has declared them to be World Heritage.

Institut Pere Mata 
Before the 19th century came to an end, at the height of modernisme, Domènech built the Institut Pere Mata, an institution for the mentally ill in Reus (1897–1919). It is an example of architecture at the service of people, without neglecting the purely aesthetic aspect. It was begun with the support of Pau Font de Rubinat, and marked an advance in the provision of medical services, at a time when there was growing support for a social approach to health. It consists of isolated pavilions organized along internal "streets", catering for all treatment needs. Domènech deploys an  ornamental language in which nature helps lighten the spirit as it penetrates into all the rooms by way of the stained glass, ceramics and mosaics. A year later, he was to use the knowledge gained at the Institut for the medically innovative design of the Hospital de Sant Pau.

Palau de la Música Catalana 

Domènech used very advanced structural solutions in this work, including laminated sections, a steel frame stabilized by a system of buttresses and perimetral vaults of Gothic inspiration and large walls of glass.

This building is a paradigm of Domènech's work: the control of the interior space and the light by means of the double facade, the stylistic unity of all the applied arts—sculpture, mosaic, stained glass and wrought ironwork. Domènech i Montaner worked with the usual artists on this work: the mosaicist Lluís Brú and the ceramicists Josep Orriols and  Modest Sunyol, with stained glass by Rigalt i Granell and   cement tiles by Escofet and sculptures by Miquel Blay, Eusebi Arnau, Didac Massana and Pau Gargallo.

Hospital de Sant Pau 
The hospital project was informed by the growing concern at the time about health in the big cities. Domènech studied various solutions that had been used around Europe (Lariboisière Hospital in Paris, St. Thomas's in London, Brugmann in Laeken, Belgium and the military hospital in Toul, France), and devised a totally innovative solution based on isolated pavilions linked by underground passages. With the combination of the  Catalan vault and steel structures like those employed at the Tres Dragons and the Palau, large, clear spaces were made possible. The sobriety of the brickwork so typical of Domènech's work is tempered by the warmth of the Montjuïc stone, as is also the case in the  Palau de la Música, with sculptures by  Pau Gargallo and Francesc Madurell i Torres.

Writings
Domènech contributed to the leading Catalan publications: La Renaixença, Lo Catalanista, Revista de Catalunya, El Diluvio and La Veu de Catalunya. In 1904, after falling out with Francesc Cambó, he ceased to contribute to La Veu de Catalunya and founded the weekly El Poble Català. He was also the author of many books, some technical works (Historia general del arte: arquitectura, 1886; Iluminación solar de los edificios, 1877) and some political and social essays ("La política tradicional d'Espanya", 1898; "Estudis polítics", 1905, "Conservació de la personalitat de Catalunya", 1912, "La Política tradicional d'Espanya: com pot salvar-se'n Catalunya", 1919).

In an article entitled “En busca de una arquitectura nacional” (In search of a national architecture), published on 28 February 1878 in La Renaixença, he set forth the guiding principles for a modern, national architecture for Catalonia.

He was also active as a publisher. He was editor of the Biblioteca Artes y Letras, published by Editorial Domènech, the family firm, for which he also designed many book-covers, and which included the works of the country's best writers and translations of the most important European authors of the time. Between 1886 and 1897, the Editorial Montaner i Simón published under his direction the monumental Historia General del Arte. Domènech also illustrated the first part, and it was continued by Josep Puig i Cadafalch.

In company with his friends Antoni M. Gallissà and Josep Font i Gumà and with members of the Centre Excursionista de Catalunya, he visited Romanesque churches in several parts of Catalonia; in  1904, those of Pallars, Ribagorça and  Cerdanya; in  1905, those of Ripollès, Gironès, Vallespir, Rosselló and  Vall d'Aran; and finally, in 1906  he visited the churches of Empordà, whose style he dubbed First Romanesque. In this way Domènech collected material for his work on Romanesque architecture, and he provided the School of Architecture with an important photographic archive.

Political activity 
Domènech became involved in politics at an early age, and in 1870 he helped to set up the  Jove Catalunya foundation and the Centre Català, from which he separated in  1887. He joined the  Lliga de Catalunya, of which he became president in  1888, and in 1891 he founded the  Unió Catalanista, of which he was the first president in 1892, with Enric Prat de la Riba as secretary. That same year he chaired the assembly that drew up the Bases de Manresa, a document that laid the foundations for the return of the historic rights acknowledged by the Catalan constitutions.

He pursued a policy of collaboration with Polavieja, who defended regionalist demands. He was also one of the signatories of the Manifest a la reina regent of 1898. The following year he joined the Centre Nacional Català which, on 25 April 1901, merged with the  Unió Regionalista, constituting the Lliga Regionalista. The Lliga was made up of sectors of the middle class who were disappointed with the policies of Polavieja and mobilized by the Tancament de Caixes; it stood for a Catalonia that would be free, strong and autonomous.

Domènech's commitment to the defence of national identity was confirmed when he stood for the legislative elections of 19 May 1901, with the candidature known as the  "quatre presidents" (four presidents). He was reelected in 1903, but he could not agree with the behaviour of Cambó during the visit by king Alfonso XIII to Barcelona in 1904. It is thought that he was the author of an anonymous article  which appeared on 14 April 1904 in the journal "Joventut". The author of the article accused the  Barcelona city councillors of weakness in defending Catalan demands before the king.  He left the Lliga Regionalista and founded the weekly "El Poble Català", around which he organized  Esquerra Catalana. Being socially conservative, however, he gradually distanced himself from it and devoted himself to archaeological and historical research, producing Centcelles. Baptisteri i celler: memòria de la primitiva església metropolitana de Tarragona (1921), Història i arquitectura del monestir de Poblet (1925), La iniquitat de Casp i la fi del Comtat d'Urgell (1930) and Ensenyes nacionals de Catalunya (1936). The last three of these were published posthumously with the assistance of his son Fèlix Domènech i Roura.

His political activities and his research led him to be elected three times as president of the Ateneu Barcelonès (1898, 1911 and 1913). In 1881 he was the "mantenidor" of the Jocs Florals, and in  1895 he presided them. He became a member of what is now known as the Reial Acadèmia Catalana de Belles Arts de Sant Jordi (1901) and entered the Acadèmia de Bones Lletres in 1921.

Works

Badalona

Barcelona

Canet de Mar

Comillas

l'Espluga de Francolí

Esplugues de Llobregat

Olot

Palma

Reus

Tarragona

Other works 
 In Barcelona:
 Casa Maria Montaner in Ronda Universitat 4, was a building owned by his mother that architect reformed. Currently disappeared.
 Torre Simon, in Gràcia. It was the mansion of Josep Simon, member of Ramon de Montaner of the editorial Montaner i Simon. Currently, the space much modified and expanded, occupies the School Corma.
 Housing in  Trafalgar 54, which has been refurbished.

 In Canet de Mar:
 Nau industrial Jover, Serra i Cia. (1899–1900) disappeared.
 Unfinished pantheon of the family Montaner-Malató (1899).
 Creu de Terme of l'Aubó (1908) partially disappeared.

 In Santander.
 Pantheon of Marquis of Satrústegui.

Sources 
 "Lluís Domènech i Montaner", Fundació Antoni Tàpies

The Spanish Wikipedia and the Catalan Wikipedia were used as sources for this article.

References

Further reading
Enric Ganell, Antoni Ramon, Lluis Domenech Girbau (2006): Lluis Domenech I Montaner: Travels Around Romanesque Architecture,  Collegi d'Arquitectes de Catalunya (COAC), 
Lluis Domenech I. Montaner (2006): Dom'nech Montaner, Collegi D'Arquitectes de Catalunya, (bilingual edition)
Bancells, Consol, 'Guia del Modernisme a l'Eixample', Nou Art Thor Edicions, Barcelona, 1990,  (Catalan).
Bancells, Consol, 'Sant Pau, Hospital Modernista', Nou Art Thor Edicions, Barcelona, 1988  (Catalan).

External links

1850 births
1923 deaths
Politicians from Barcelona
Architects from Catalonia
19th-century Spanish architects
Modernisme architects
20th-century Spanish architects